Aletris lutea (Yellow colic-root)  is a plant species native to the southeastern United States from Louisiana to Georgia.

Aletris lutea grows in wet areas, especially seasonally flooded pine forests near the coast. It is a perennial herb up to 100 cm tall, with a long spike of small, cylindrical flowers. Flowers are usually yellow but sometimes white.

References

Nartheciaceae
Endemic flora of the United States
Flora of the Southeastern United States
Plants described in 1899